In the human nervous system the temporopontine fibers, a component of the corticopontine tract are lateral to the cerebrospinal fibers; they originate in the temporal lobe and end in the nuclei pontis.

References

Pons
Temporal lobe
Cerebral white matter